Mojtaba Goleij (born 23 January 1996) is an Iranian freestyle wrestler. He won one of the bronze medals in the men's 97 kg event at the 2021 World Wrestling Championships held in Oslo, Norway. He is also a two-time medalist, including one gold, at the Asian Wrestling Championships.

Career 

In 2017, he won the gold medal in the men's 97 kg event at the Asian Indoor and Martial Arts Games held in Ashgabat, Turkmenistan.

He won the gold medal in the men's 97 kg event at the 2020 Asian Wrestling Championships held in New Delhi, India. Two years earlier, he won the silver medal in this event at the 2018 Asian Wrestling Championships held in Bishkek, Kyrgyzstan.

He won the gold medal in his event at the 2021 Islamic Solidarity Games held in Konya, Turkey.

Achievements

References

External links 
 

Living people
1996 births
Iranian male sport wrestlers
People from Tonekabon
Asian Wrestling Championships medalists
World Wrestling Championships medalists
Sportspeople from Mazandaran province
Islamic Solidarity Games competitors for Iran
Islamic Solidarity Games medalists in wrestling
21st-century Iranian people